Maksym Ihorovych Kazakov (born 6 February 1996) is a Ukrainian professional footballer who plays for Zorya Luhansk.

Club career
He made his Ukrainian Premier League debut for FC Zorya Luhansk on 2 September 2018 in a game against FC Arsenal Kyiv.

References

External links
 

1996 births
Living people
Footballers from Kyiv
Ukrainian footballers
Ukraine youth international footballers
Association football midfielders
FC Arsenal Kyiv players
FC Dynamo Kyiv players
FC Zorya Luhansk players
Ukrainian Premier League players